B.C. VITA Tbilisi is a professional basketball team based in Tbilisi, Georgia. Home games of the club are played in the Tbilisi Sports Palace, which has a capacity of 9,700 people. The club currently plays in the A-Liga, the second tier of basketball in Georgia.

History
During the '90s VITA dominated the Georgian Superliga, and won 6 consecutive championships from 1993 through 1998. In the 2015–16 season, they entered the VTB United League.

Honours
Georgian Superliga
Winners (6): 1992–93, 1993–94, 1994–95, 1995–96, 1996–97, 1997–98

Players

Roster for 2015-16 VTB League

References

External links
 Website
 Eurobasket.com page
 VTB United League Team page
 Facebook page
 Twitter page

Basketball teams in Georgia (country)
Sport in Tbilisi
Basketball teams established in 1992
1992 establishments in Georgia (country)